Rachel Rhodes is the name of:
 Mother-one (Rachel L. Rhodes), fictional character in Wildstorm Productions' Wetworks comics
 Rei Yasuda (born Rachel Rhodes; 1993), Japanese singer